Esperanza Airport ,  is a rural airport  east of Lautaro, a city in the Araucanía Region of Chile.

See also
Transport in Chile
List of airports in Chile

References

External links
OpenStreetMap - Esperanza
OurAirports - Esperanza
FallingRain - Esperanza Airport

Airports in La Araucanía Region